Embraer S.A. is a Brazilian multinational aerospace manufacturer that produces commercial, military, executive and agricultural aircraft, and provides aeronautical services. It was founded in 1969 in São José dos Campos, São Paulo, where its headquarters are located. The company is the third largest producer of civil aircraft, after Boeing and Airbus.

History
Seeking to develop a domestic aircraft industry, the Brazilian government under Getúlio Vargas' Estado Novo made several investments in the aerospace industry during the 1940s and 1950s. However, it was not until 1969, following the rise to power of a military junta in the 1964 Brazilian coup d'état, that Empresa Brasileira de Aeronáutica (Embraer) was created as a government-owned corporation. Its first president, Ozires Silva, was a government appointee, and the company initially only produced a turboprop passenger aircraft, the Embraer EMB 110 Bandeirante.

Early growth
The Brazilian government contributed to Embraer's early growth by providing production contracts.  The company sold solely to the domestic market until 1975.

While military aircraft made up the majority of Embraer's products during the 1970s and early 1980s, including the Embraer AT-26 Xavante and the Embraer EMB 312 Tucano, it debuted a regional airliner, the Embraer EMB 110 Bandeirante, making its first flight in 1968 and the Embraer EMB 120 Brasilia, in 1985. Aimed at the export market, this plane was the first in a series of highly successful small and regional airliners.

License-built Pipers
In 1974, the company started to produce Piper light airplanes under license. Piper first put together knock-down kits in their US factory for Embraer to assemble and market in Brazil and Latin America.  By 1978, most of the parts and components were being sourced locally. Between 1974 and 2000, nearly 2,500 license-built Pipers were produced by Embraer.

Acquisition of Aerotec
Aerotec S/A Indústria Aeronáutica was a design and manufacturing company founded in São José dos Campos in 1962 under the auspices of the Brazilian General Command for Aerospace Technology.  Beginning in the late 1960s, the firm manufactured a two-seat trainer for the Brazilian Air Force, the Aerotec Uirapuru. A small number were also built for the civilian market, and others were exported to other Latin American countries.

By 1980, Aerotec's main business was producing components for Embraer. However, around this time, the Brazilian Air Force became interested in an upgraded version of the Uirapuru. A prototype, designated Uirapuru II, was built; but, by the time it flew, the Air Force no longer required it. A small number were built for export. In 1987, the firm was sold to Embraer.

Privatization
Born from a Brazilian government plan and having been state-run, Embraer eventually started a privatisation process in 1992 alongside other state-run companies, such as Telebras and Vale. Privatisation was a key policy of the economically liberal PRN government of Fernando Collor, elected in the 1989 presidential election.

Embraer was sold to private investors on December 7, 1994, which helped it avoid a looming bankruptcy. The Brazilian government retained interest through possession of golden shares, which allow it veto power. Embraer continued to win government contracts throughout the 2000s and 2010s.

Initial public offerings
In 2000, Embraer made simultaneous initial public offerings on the NYSE and BM&F Bovespa stock exchanges. As of 2008 its NYSE-traded shares were American depositary receipts representing 4 BM&F Bovespa shares and it was partially owned by the Bozano Group (11.10%), Previ (16.40%), Sistel (7.40%), Dassault Aviation (2.1%), EADS (2.1%), Thales (2.1%), Safran (1.1%), and the government of Brazil (0.3% and golden share), the remainder being publicly traded.

As of December 31, 2014 the shareholders with more than 5% of the company's capital were:
 OppenheimerFunds, 12.29%
 Caixa de Previdência dos Funcionários do Banco do Brasil, 6.71%
 Baillie Gifford, 6.46%
 BNDESPAR, 5.31%.

Product line expansion: military, regional and executive
In the mid-1990s, the company pursued a product line focused on small commercial airplanes over the military aircraft that had previously made up the majority of its manufacturing. It soon expanded to the production of larger regional airliners in the 70–110 seat range, and smaller business jets.

By May 2019, Embraer was considering developing a new family of turboprop regional airliners in the 50–70 seat range, complementing the E-Jet E2, so as to free engineering resources.
In August 2021, Embraer released a new configuration with quieter aft-mounted engines for a 70-90 seat aircraft, with the E-Jet cross-section, aiming for a 2022 launch and a 2027/2028 service entry.

Executive jets 
At the 2000 Farnborough Airshow, Embraer launched the Legacy 600, a business jet variant of the Embraer Regional Jet. In 2002, a dedicated subsidiary, Embraer Executive Jets, was created, as the Legacy was introduced into service. In 2005, the Phenom 100 was first envisioned as an air taxi similar to the Eclipse 500, competing with Cessna and Hawker Beechcraft. It was introduced in 2008 and is the basis of the larger Phenom 300. The midsize Legacy 450 and Legacy 500 were jointly developed as clean sheet designs, while the Lineage 1000 is a VIP version of the E190. In 2016, Embraer delivered its 1,000th executive jet and had a market share of 17% by volume, though it lacked an ultra-long-range large cabin jet. In October 2018 Embraer announced two new business jets—the Praetor 500 in the midsize cabin category—and the Praetor 600 in the super midsize category.

Military transport
On April 19, 2007, Embraer announced it was considering the production of a twin-jet military transport. Work began in May 2009 with funding from the Brazilian Air Force. Correios, the Brazilian postal service, has shown interest in buying this aircraft. Using much of the technology developed for the Embraer 190, the C-390 would carry up to 23 tons of cargo and aims to replace Cold War-era cargo aircraft.

While firm orders for the yet-to-be-produced KC-390 transport had not yet been made in the fall of 2010, Argentina asked for six examples and several other South American nations also expressed interest.

Government subsidy controversy

Brazil and Canada engaged in an international, adjudicated trade dispute over government subsidies to domestic plane-makers in the late 1990s and early 2000s. The World Trade Organization determined that both countries had provided illegal subsidies to what were supposed to be privately owned industries. Brazil ran an illegal subsidy program, Proex, benefiting its national aviation industry from at least 1999–2000, and Canada illegally subsidized its indigenous regional airliner industry, comprising Bombardier Aerospace.

Proposed Boeing-Embraer joint venture

On July 5, 2018, a joint venture with Boeing was announced that would see Boeing owning 80% of Embraer's commercial aviation division. This was seen as a reaction to Airbus' acquisition of a majority in the competing Bombardier CSeries on October 16, 2017. Under the 2018 plan, Embraer would retain its executive business jet and its defence business.

On May 23, 2019, Boeing announced that the resulting division would be known as Boeing BrasilCommercial, dropping the Embraer name, but had not yet decided whether the aircraft would be rebranded as Boeing models.  On November 18, 2019, Boeing (49%) and Embraer (51%) announced a joint venture to promote and develop new markets for the C-390 Millennium tactical transport aircraft, named Boeing Embraer – Defense, to operate after the regulatory approvals and closing conditions.

In April 2020, Boeing canceled its acquisition of Embraer's commercial operations after being heavily affected financially by the air crisis initiated by the COVID-19 pandemic and by the 737 MAX groundings.

In November 2020, Embraer announced that its loss for the third quarter of the year is $121 million due to the COVID-19 pandemic and the travel restrictions.

STOUT light military transport aircraft

In December 2019, Embraer and the Brazilian Air Force tackled the development of a light military transport aircraft.
The Short Take Off Utility Transport (STOUT) would replace its 64 EMB-110 Bandeirante (average age of 38.3 years) and 19 EMB-120 Brasilia (average age of 26.5 years) with similar dimensions.

Production bases and facilities
The company's headquarters and main production base are in São José dos Campos, São Paulo, Brazil. It also has production bases in the State of São Paulo at Botucatu, Eugênio de Melo (a district of São José dos Campos) and Gavião Peixoto. The company has offices in Beijing, Fort Lauderdale, Florida, Amsterdam, Singapore, and Washington, D.C.

Non-Brazilian main facilities
Production facilities for the Phenom 100EV and 300E, and Praetor 500 and 600 at Melbourne Orlando International Airport in Florida USA.

Subsidiaries
EAMS – Embraer Aircraft Maintenance Services Inc. (Nashville, TN, U.S.) – maintenance services site.
OGMA – Indústria Aeronáutica de Portugal (Alverca do Ribatejo, Portugal) – aircraft component maintenance, repair and manufacturing, plus aircraft maintenance services.
Embraer Aircraft Holding, Inc. – Its U.S. headquarters are in Fort Lauderdale, Florida, in a facility founded in 1979. Its external relations office is in Washington, D.C.
Embraer Aero Seating Technologies – Inaugurated in September 2016 in the city of Titusville, Florida, Embraer Aero Seating Technologies produces aircraft seats.
Mesa Unit (Located in Mesa, Arizona, U.S.) – Implemented in 2008, performs maintenance, repair and overhaul services on the Phenom and Legacy executive aircraft line.
Windsor Locks Unit (Located in Windsor Locks, Connecticut, U.S.) – Implemented in 2008, as well as the Mesa Unit, also performs maintenance, repair and revision services in Embraer's executive line.
Melbourne Unit (Located in Melbourne, Florida, U.S.) – Implemented in 2011, it is the first unit in the United States to carry out the final assembly of aircraft. It produces the line of executives Phenom 100 and Phenom 300. In November 2012 work began on an Engineering and Technology Center at the Melbourne facility.
ECC Leasing – Embraer's in-house leasing division, based in Dublin, Ireland, managing and re-marketing the Embraer aircraft portfolio owned directly by the manufacturer.
Eve - Embraer's SPAC partnership potentially merging with the Zanite Acquisition Corp.

Joint ventures
Harbin Embraer (Harbin, China) – manufactures aircraft from the ERJ family for the Chinese market (canceled)
Embraer's commercial airliner portfolio, as well as the KC-390, would be part of two separate joint ventures with Boeing. In the case of the civil aircraft line, Boeing would own 80% of the resulting firm. (canceled)

Aircraft models

Commercial
By December 2018, Embraer claimed to lead the sub 150 seat jetliner market with 100 operators of the ERJ and E-Jet families.

Current 
Embraer E-Jet family
Embraer 170 (66–78 passengers)
Embraer 175 (76–88 passengers)
Embraer 190 (96–114 passengers)
Embraer 195 (100–124 passengers)
Embraer E-Jet E2 family
Embraer 175-E2 (80–90 passengers)
Embraer 190-E2 (97–114 passengers)
Embraer 195-E2 (120–146 passengers)

Former 
Embraer EMB 110 Bandeirante (18 passengers)
Embraer EMB 120 Brasilia (30 passengers)
Embraer ERJ family
Embraer ERJ 135 (37 passengers)
Embraer ERJ 140 (44 passengers)
Embraer ERJ 145 (50 passengers)
Embraer/FMA CBA 123 Vector (prototype)

Military

Current
Embraer EMB 314 Super Tucano (light attack)
Embraer C-390 Millennium (medium transport)
Embraer R-99 (Airborne early warning and control)
JAS 39 Gripen E/F (multirole fighter)

Former
Embraer EMB 111 Bandeirante (light transport)
Embraer EMB 312 Tucano (trainer)
AMX International AMX (attack jet)
Embraer MFT-LF (trainer/light attack, prototype only)
Embraer Xavante (localized variant of the Aermacchi MB-326)

Business jets

Current 
Embraer Phenom 100 (very light jet)
Embraer Phenom 300 (light jet)
Embraer Praetor 500 (mid-size jet)
Embraer Praetor 600 (super mid-size jet)

Former
Embraer Legacy 450 (mid-size jet)
Embraer Legacy 500 (super mid-size jet)
Embraer Legacy 600/650 (large jet, developed from the ERJ family)
Embraer Lineage 1000 (ultra-large jet, developed from the E-Jet family)

Utility

Current
Embraer EMB 202 Ipanema (cropduster)

Former
Embraer EMB 121 Xingu (general utility)

Piper localizations

Current 
Embraer Seneca (based on Piper PA-34)
Embraer Corisco/Tupi (based on Piper PA-28 Archer II)

Former
Embraer Carioca/Minuano/Sertanejo (based on Piper PA-32)
Embraer Navajo (based on Piper PA-31)

Commercial aircraft deliveries

The numbers include military versions of commercial aircraft.

Total delivered-backlog-options as of June 30, 2007: 862-53-131 145 Family, 256-399-719 170/190 Family

References

Further reading

External links

 
1969 establishments in Brazil
Aerospace companies of Brazil
Aircraft manufacturers of Brazil
Brazilian brands
Companies based in São Paulo (state)
Companies listed on the New York Stock Exchange
Companies listed on B3 (stock exchange)
Defence companies of Brazil
Manufacturing companies established in 1969
Multinational companies headquartered in Brazil
Organisations based in São José dos Campos
Brazilian companies established in 1969